Jackson Moore is an alto saxophonist and composer living in New York.  In the 1990s he studied with Jackie McLean and Anthony Braxton in Connecticut.  He organizes an annual Jazz Festival, the New Languages Festival.  He is also known for designing Moss, a musical language modeled on pidgins.

Discography

With Anthony Braxton
 Ninetet (Yoshi's) 1997 Vol. 1 (Leo, 1997 [2002])
 Ninetet (Yoshi's) 1997 Vol. 2 (Leo, 1997 [2003])
 Ninetet (Yoshi's) 1997 Vol. 3 (Leo, 1997 [2003])
 Ninetet (Yoshi's) 1997 Vol. 4 (Leo, 1997 [2007])
Two Compositions (Trio) 1998 (Leo, 1998 [2003])

References

External links 
Home Page
The Language of Moss

1976 births
Living people
Avant-garde jazz musicians
American jazz saxophonists
American male saxophonists
21st-century American saxophonists
21st-century American male musicians
American male jazz musicians